John F. Summers (born April 4, 1957) is an American former competitive ice dancer. With partner Stacey Smith, he is the 1978-1980 U.S. national champion. They represented the United States at the 1980 Winter Olympics where they placed 9th.  He graduated from the University of Pennsylvania with a M.S.E. in Computer Science. He is currently a Vice President at Akamai Technologies where he is General Manager of Enterprise Products.

Competitive highlight
(with Smith)

References

 
  
 https://www.rsaconference.com/speakers/john-summers

American male ice dancers
Figure skaters at the 1980 Winter Olympics
Olympic figure skaters of the United States
1957 births
Living people
People from Bethesda, Maryland